Paula Milne is a British screenwriter. Her works include The Politician's Wife, The Virgin Queen, Chandler & Co, Die Kinder, Second Sight, Driving Ambition, Small Island and Endgame.

Her first single drama was A Sudden Wrench, after working on titles such as Coronation Street and Juliet Bravo.

She also devised the BBC medical drama Angels.

Notable works 
Television
 1982: A Sudden Wrench (Play for Today episode)
 1982: John David (Play for Today episode)
 1976 - 1979: Coronation Street 
 1980: Juliet Bravo
 1984: Driving Ambition
 1990: Die Kinder
 1994-1995: Chandler & Co
 1995: The Politician's Wife (Channel 4)
 1997: The Fragile Heart (Carnival/Channel 4)
 2006: The Virgin Queen (TV serial)
 2009: Small Island (BBC TV movie) (based on the novel of the same name by Andrea Levy)
 2011: The Night Watch (BBC) (based on the novel of the same name by Sarah Waters)
 2012: White Heat (ITVP/BBC)
 2013: The Politician's Husband (BBC)
 2013: Second Sight (TV movie)
 2016: HIM (ITV)
 2017: The Same Sky (ZDF)

Film

 1995: Mad Love (Touchstone Pictures)
 1996: Hollow Reed (Scala/Channel 4 Films)
 2000: I Dreamed of Africa (Paramount) (based on the novel of the same name by Kuki Gallmann)
 2009: Endgame

References

External links 
 

British television writers
British women screenwriters
Living people
1947 births
British women television writers